The Chambersburg and Gettysburg Electric Railway was an interurban trolley system of the early 20th century in south central Pennsylvania. Built in 1903, the line ran from Chambersburg eastward to Caledonia State Park. The line was to be extended to Gettysburg, but the cost of dealing with the steep grades on that section prevented completion. Due to disputes over line crossings with the Pennsylvania Railroad, the line did not open until 1905. It operated until December 21, 1926.

The C&G used a  broad gauge, similar to other Pennsylvania interurban lines.

See also
 Chambersburg, Greencastle and Waynesboro Street Railway
 Chambersburg and Shippensburg Railway

References 

Defunct Pennsylvania railroads
Interurban railways in Pennsylvania
Transportation in Franklin County, Pennsylvania
Railway companies established in 1903
Railway companies disestablished in 1926
5 ft 2½ in gauge railways in the United States
1903 establishments in Pennsylvania
1926 disestablishments in Pennsylvania